Peter Edward McIntyre (born 27 April 1966) is a former Australian cricketer who played in two Test matches in the 1990s.

He was a leg-spin bowler, unlucky to have arrived at the same time as fellow spin bowlers Shane Warne, and to a lesser extent, Stuart MacGill; consequently he never managed to establish himself fully in the national side.  He played in two Tests, one against England in Adelaide in 1995 and another against India at New Delhi in 1996.

Peter McIntyre had an unprecedented success rate against Sachin Tendulkar, who played against him just once – in a one-off Test in Delhi in October 1996 (Shane Warne was missing after finger surgery). It was Tendulkar's first match as captain – he started with a victory, despite a modest match personally with the bat – and McIntyre had him caught for 10 by Mark Waugh with the second ball he bowled to him. McIntyre went on to take 3 for 103 but, according to Wisden, "bowled steadily but without variation or much imagination". This was his second Test – and he did not play another one, once Warne returned.

In the 1995–96 Sheffield Shield final, he and Shane George, South Australia's last two batsmen, held out the Western Australian bowlers for 40 minutes to ensure a draw and, as a result, victory for South Australia in the season's Shield competition.

He retired from first-class cricket in 2002, having debuted in 1988.

References

External links

1966 births
Living people
Australia Test cricketers
South Australia cricketers
Victoria cricketers
Australian cricketers
Cricketers from Victoria (Australia)
People from Gisborne, Victoria